Deichkind (literally Dyke Child) is a German electropunk band formed in Hamburg in 1997. Current members are “Kryptik Joe” alias Philipp Grütering (rapper/songwriter), Henning “DJ Phono” Besser (DJ), Sebastian “Porky” Dürre (rapper/songwriter) and Roland “Roy” Knauf (producer). Deichkind started with hip hop, later added elements of electronic dance music to its style. The band themselves call their music TechRap. As a combination of techno and rap music. The songs are often satirical and criticize consumerism and the performance-oriented society.

History 
The band had its first success at the turn of the millennium with single Bon Voyage. Deichkind's early style could be described as alternative hip hop, during the 2000s its style incorporated more and more elements from electronic music, dance and punk. The most famous examples of this electronic-leaning hip hop sound are the three singles, Remmidemmi (Yippie Yippie Yeah) (2006), Arbeit nervt (2008), and Leider geil (2012). These three singles placed in the charts.

In 2005, the group represented Mecklenburg-Vorpommern in the Bundesvision Song Contest 2005, with the song Electric Super Dance Band, placing 14th with 12 points.

In 2009, Sebastian “Sebi” Hackert, the band's longtime producer, died.

Befehl von ganz unten (2012) was Deichkind's first hit album, selling more than 200,000 units. Niveau Weshalb Warum (2015) debuted at number-one on the album charts in Germany and Switzerland.

The group contributed the song Happy New Fear to the soundtrack of the German film  Victoria in 2015.

In 2018, rapper Sascha Reimann alias Ferris MC and “Ferris Hilton” left Deichkind after ten years.

Although the band originates from Hamburg, it now works mainly in Berlin.

Discography

Studio albums

Singles

References

External links 

 
 

German hip hop groups
Hamburg hip hop
Musical groups established in 1999
Musical groups from Hamburg
Participants in the Bundesvision Song Contest
1999 establishments in Germany